Juan Cabral (born, 1978) is an Argentine writer and director, whose work includes short and feature films, music videos and commercials.

Career
Cabral wrote and directed Gorilla for Cadbury - voted 'Favourite Ad of all time' in the UK. He is also the creator of the famous Sony Bravia Trilogy ( Balls, Paint and Playdoh). Cabral has been written about in the Wall Street Journal, The Independent, The Guardian, The Times and Esquire magazine and was also included in The Evening Standard 'London's most influential people' list.

Cabral has won every major award in advertising (including over 25 Cannes Lions and two Cannes grand Prix). His breathtaking advert for Ikea - Beds - was awarded Best Crafted Commercial of the year by BTAA and also voted Best Campaign of the year by Campaign Magazine. In 2016 Cabral was nominated by the DGA for Outstanding Directorial Achievement in Commercials. He recently directed the Rolex 2019 Oscars campaign featuring Martin Scorsese, Alejandro Gonzalez Iñarritu, Kathryn Bigelow and James Cameron.

His first feature film Two/One is premiering in the 2019 Tribeca Film Festival. It stars Boyd Holbrook and Song Yang and it's the story of two men who dream each other and are, in some strange way, the same person.

Cabral is developing other feature films, scripts and TV shows and is represented by the commercial production company, MJZ.

References

External links
 

1978 births
Living people
Argentine film directors